Rati Gupta (born February 9, 1984) is an American dancer and actress known for her recurring role as Anu, the fiancée of Rajesh Ramayan Koothrappali in the CBS sitcom The Big Bang Theory.

Early life
Gupta was born in Michigan City, Indiana to her parents who had moved to the United States from India. Her father is a doctor who hails from a small town north of New Delhi and her mother is from Varanasi. While her parents were both born in North India, Gupta herself does not speak Hindi. Gupta is a Psychology and Pre-medicine major from Northwestern University.

Career
Her initial career interest was in dancing, but she kept hitting "wall after wall", leaving her feeling dejected. She eventually decided to try out acting and received her first acting lessons in Los Angeles from an individual she describes as the "go-to sitcom comedy teacher".

Gupta appeared in a recurring role in Season 2 of the Hulu series Future Man. She is set to appear in a guest role on the Netflix series Unbelievable. Her acting credits also include MTV film "Worst. Prom. Ever." and the FX comedy Better Things.

Filmography

Television

References

External links 
 

1984 births
21st-century American actresses
Actresses from Indiana
American television actresses
American women comedians
Living people
People from Michigan City, Indiana
21st-century American comedians
Northwestern University alumni